Shemar Bridges is an American football wide receiver for the Baltimore Ravens of the National Football League (NFL). He played college football at Fort Valley State.

Early life and high school
Bridges grew up in Jacksonville, Florida and attended Potter's House Christian Academy.

College career
Bridges began his college football career at Tusculum. He redshirted his true freshman season and transferred to Fort Valley State after his redshirt freshman year. Bridges was named second team All-Southern Intercollegiate Athletic Conference as a redshirt sophomore after finishing the season with 51 receptions for 765 yards and four touchdowns. He caught 13 passes for 301 yards and two touchdowns during his redshirt junior season, which was shortened to two games and played in the spring of 2021 due to the COVID-19 pandemic. Bridges played in four games as a senior and had  28 receptions for 292 yards and 1 touchdown.

Professional career
Bridges signed with the Baltimore Ravens as an undrafted free agent on May 7, 2022. He was waived with an injury designation on August 30, 2022, during final roster cuts. On November 30, 2022, Bridges signed to the practice squad. Bridges signed a reserve/future contract with the Ravens on January 16, 2023.

References

External links
Tusculum Pioneers bio
Fort Valley State Wildcats bio
Baltimore Ravens bio

1997 births
Living people
American football wide receivers
Players of American football from Florida
Fort Valley State Wildcats football players
Baltimore Ravens players